The Leadership Conference on Civil and Human Rights (The Leadership Conference), formerly called the Leadership Conference on Civil Rights, is an umbrella group of American civil rights interest groups.

Organizational history
The Leadership Conference was founded in 1950 by leaders of the American Civil Rights Movement: Brotherhood of Sleeping Car Porters founder A. Philip Randolph, NAACP executive secretary Roy Wilkins, National Jewish Community Relations Advisory Council leader Arnold Aronson, and United Auto Workers president, Walter Reuther. Rather than staging sit-in protests or marches in the streets, the organization worked directly to pass laws with Congress protecting rights for everyone.

Leadership and organizational structure

The Leadership Conference is currently led by Maya Wiley who took the helm in 2022 upon the retirement of Wade Henderson who had served as President and CEO of both The Leadership Conference and The Leadership Conference Education Fund (see below) from 2010-2017 and as interim President and CEO since the departure of Vanita Gupta in 2021. Previously, Karen McGill Lawson was Executive Vice President and COO of both organizations; and Nancy M. Zirkin was Executive Vice President for Policy of both organizations.  Dorothy Height, who had been Chairperson of the Leadership Conference's Executive Committee, died on April 20, 2010.

As of December 2022, the Leadership Conference website reported that the organization had "more than 30" member organizations.  The site described the organization's mission as "promot[ing] and protect[ing] the civil and human rights of all persons in the United States . . . [t]hrough advocacy and outreach to targeted constituencies . . . ."

According to the organization's website, "The Leadership Conference is a 501(c)(4) organization that engages in legislative advocacy.  It ... has coordinated national lobbying efforts on behalf of every major civil rights law since 1957."

The Leadership Conference Education Fund, described by the Leadership Conference website as "the education and research arm of The Leadership Conference," was founded in 1969.  It was previously known as the Leadership Conference on Civil Rights Education Fund.

According to the Leadership Conference website, the Education Fund "builds public will for federal policies that promote and protect the civil and human rights of all persons in the United States.  The Education Fund's campaigns empower and mobilize advocates around the country to push for progressive change in the United States."

The Education Fund is a 501(c)(3) organization, which means that contributions are tax-deductible.

Issues 
The Leadership Conference focuses on democracy, justice, inclusion and opportunity. The organization scores members of Congress based on their votes for civil rights issues.

Member organizations

A. Philip Randolph Institute
AARP
AAUW (formerly known as the American Association of University Women)
Advancement Project
Alaska Federation of Natives
Alpha Kappa Alpha
Alpha Phi Alpha
American-Arab Anti-Discrimination Committee
American Association for Access, Equity and Diversity
American Association of Colleges for Teacher Education
American Association of People with Disabilities
American Civil Liberties Union
American Council of the Blind
American Ethical Union
American Federation of Government Employees, AFL-CIO
American Federation of Labor and Congress of Industrial Organizations
American Federation of State, County & Municipal Employees, AFL-CIO
American Federation of Teachers, AFL-CIO
American Humanist Association
American Islamic Congress
American Jewish Committee
American Postal Workers Union, AFL-CIO
American Speech-Language-Hearing Association
Americans for Democratic Action
Americans United for Separation of Church and State
Amnesty International USA
The Andrew Goodman Foundation
Anti-Defamation League
Appleseed
Arab American Institute Foundation
The Arc
Asian Americans Advancing Justice
Asian & Pacific Islander American Health Forum
Asian Pacific American Labor Alliance, AFL-CIO
The Association of Junior Leagues International Inc.
Association of People Supporting Employment First
Association of University Centers on Disabilities
Autistic Self Advocacy Network
Bend the Arc
B'nai B'rith International
Brennan Center for Justice at New York University School of Law
Campaign for Youth Justice
Center for Constitutional Rights
Center for Law and Social Policy
Center for Media Justice
Center for Popular Democracy
Center for Reproductive Rights
Center for Responsible Lending
Children's Defense Fund
Church of the Brethren - World Ministries Commission
Coalition of Black Trade Unionists
Coalition on Human Needs
Common Cause
Communications Workers of America, AFL-CIO
Community Action Partnership
Community Change
Compassion & Choices
Consortium for Citizens with Disabilities
Council of Parent Attorneys and Advocates, Inc.
DC Vote
Defending Rights and Dissent
Delta Sigma Theta
Dēmos
Disability Rights Education and Defense Fund
Drug Policy Alliance
Equal Justice Society
Equally American Legal Defense and Education Fund
FairVote
Families USA
Federally Employed Women
Feminist Majority
Friends Committee on National Legislation
Girls Inc.
GLSEN
Hadassah, The Women's Zionist Organization of America
Hindu American Foundation
Hip Hop Caucus
Hispanic Federation
Human Rights Campaign
Human Rights First
Human Rights Watch
Impact Fund
Institute for Intellectual Property and Social Justice
International Association of Machinists and Aerospace Workers
International Association of Official Human Rights Agencies
International Brotherhood of Teamsters
International Union, United Automobile, Aerospace and Agricultural Implement Workers of America
Iota Phi Lambda
Japanese American Citizens League
Jewish Council for Public Affairs
Jewish Labor Committee
Judge David L. Bazelon Center for Mental Health Law
Justice in Aging
Juvenile Law Center
Kappa Alpha Psi
Labor Council for Latin American Advancement
Laborers' International Union of North America
Lambda Legal
LatinoJustice PRLDEF
Lawyers' Committee for Civil Rights Under Law
League of United Latin American Citizens
League of Women Voters of the United States
Legal Aid At Work
Legal Momentum
Matthew Shepard Foundation
Mexican American Legal Defense and Educational Fund
Muslim Advocates
Muslim Public Affairs Council
NAACP Legal Defense and Educational Fund
NALEO Educational Fund
National Alliance for Partnerships in Equity
National Alliance Of Postal and Federal Employees
National Association for Equal Opportunity in Higher Education
National Association for the Advancement of Colored People (NAACP)
National Association of Community Health Centers
National Association of Consumer Advocates (NACA)
National Association of Councils on Developmental Disabilities
National Association of Human Rights Workers
National Association of Neighborhoods
National Association of Social Workers
National Bar Association
National Black Caucus of State Legislators
National Black Justice Coalition
National Center for Learning Disabilities
National Center for Special Education in Charter Schools
National Center for Transgender Equality
National Center for Youth Law
National Coalition for Asian Pacific American Community Development 
National Coalition for the Homeless
National Coalition on Black Civic Participation
National Coalition to Abolish the Death Penalty
National College Access Network
National Congress of American Indians
National Consumer Law Center
National Council of Churches
National Council of Jewish Women
National Council of Negro Women
National Council of Teachers of English
National Council on Independent Living
National Disability Rights Network
National Down Syndrome Congress
National Education Association
National Employment Law Projects
National Employment Lawyers Association
National Fair Housing Alliance
National Farmers Union
National Indian Education Association
National LGBTQ Task Force
National Health Law Program
National Hispanic Media Coalition
National Immigration Forum
National Immigration Law Center
National Korean American Service and Education Consortium
National Latina Institute for Reproductive Health
National Law Center on Homelessness & Poverty
National Lawyers Guild
National Legal Aid and Defender Association
National Low Income Housing Coalition
National Network for Arab American Communities
National Organization for Women
National Partnership for Women and Families
National Sorority of Phi Delta Kappa, Inc.
National Urban League
National Women's Law Center
Native American Rights Fund
New Jersey Institute for Social Justice
Newspaper Guild
9to5, National Association of Working Women
OCA (formerly known as Organization of Chinese Americans)
Office of Communication of the United Church of Christ
Omega Psi Phi
Open Society Policy Center
Paralyzed Veterans of America
PFLAG
People For the American Way
Phi Beta Sigma
Planned Parenthood Federation of America
PolicyLink
Poverty & Race Research Action Council (PRRAC)
Pride at Work
Prison Policy Initiative
Public Advocates Inc.
Religious Action Center of Reform Judaism
Retail, Wholesale and Department Store Union, AFL-CIO
Sargent Shriver National Center on Poverty Law
Secular Coalition for America
Service Employees International Union
The Sierra Club
Sigma Gamma Rho
Sikh American Legal Defense and Education Fund 
Sikh Coalition
South Asian Americans Leading Together 
Southeast Asia Resource Action Center
Southern Christian Leadership Conference
Southern Poverty Law Center
TASH
Teach For America
Transportation Learning Center
UnidosUS (formerly National Council of La Raza)
Union for Reform Judaism
United Brotherhood of Carpenters and Joiners of America
United Farm Workers of America, AFL-CIO
United Food and Commercial Workers International Union
United Methodist Church - General Board of Church and Society
United Mine Workers, AFL-CIO
United States International Council on Disabilities
United States Student Association
United Steelworkers
Voices for Progress
The Voter Participation Center
Voto Latino
Workers Defense League
YWCA USA

See also 
 Voting Rights Act

References

External links
 

Political advocacy groups in the United States
501(c)(4) nonprofit organizations
Liberalism in the United States
Organizations established in 1950
1950 establishments in the United States